Jan Husarik is a Slovak naïve artist and president of Smäd, a professional association of Kovačica naïve artists.

Biography
Husarik was born in 1942 in Padina, of Slovak origin. He began painting in 1958, and exhibited for the first time in 1969 in Belgrade. Husarik grew up in poverty and has little formal education.  He worked as a farmer, and having little land, dedicate more time to painting.

Work
Husarik's style and use of color is in keeping with the Kovačica naïve art school.  His work shows an interest in certain topics to which he returns again and again, which can best be described as thirst or yearning, as derived from love of his homeland and love of the past.  In his paintings, strong colors predominate, and among these he favors orange.

Husarick also has an interest in the legendary city of Troy which is the subject of many of his works.

Recognition
In his half century career, Husarik has had numerous exhibitions from Paris to Melbourne and Sydney. He has received he greatest recognition in Italy and France. In Italy, he was honored with membership in the International Association of Culture in Naples, while in France, he was named a Chevalier of The Order of Arts and Letters.

References

External links
 http://www.askart.com/askart/artist.aspx?artist=11162615
 https://web.archive.org/web/20120423060033/http://www.hl.rs/vnutorne-rysy-skutocnosti

1942 births
Living people
Slovak artists